William Franklin Traffley (December 21, 1859 – June 23, 1908) was a baseball player.

Biography

Traffley was born in Staten Island, New York. When he was 18 years old, in 1878, he played two games for the Chicago White Stockings.

Traffley did not play in professional baseball for another five years, in 1883. He played 30 games that season.

His next three seasons (and his last) were spent with the Baltimore Orioles.

Traffley died in Des Moines, Iowa. His brother, John Traffley, also played professional baseball.

References
Baseball-Reference

1859 births
1908 deaths
Chicago White Stockings players
Cincinnati Red Stockings (AA) players
Baltimore Orioles (AA) players
19th-century baseball players
Major League Baseball catchers
Sportspeople from Staten Island
Baseball players from New York City
Omaha Green Stockings players
Duluth Jayhawks players
Minneapolis Millers (baseball) players
Toronto Canucks players
Des Moines Prohibitionists players
Lincoln Rustlers players
Omaha Lambs players
Deadwood Metropolitans players
Kansas City Blues (baseball) players
Des Moines Indians players
Quincy Little Giants players
Hartford Cooperatives players
Minor league baseball managers